Sakharoli is a small village in Ratnagiri district, Maharashtra state in Western India. The 2011 Census of India recorded 962 residents in the village.

Sakharoli Kh. is a small village in the same region. The 2011 Census of India recorded 587 residents in the village.

References

Villages in Ratnagiri district